The Dirt Gang is a 1972 American action drama film directed by Jerry Jameson and starring Paul Carr, Michael Pataki, Lee de Broux, Jon Shank, Nancy Harris, T.J. Escott, and Jessica Stuart. The film was released by American International Pictures in November 1972.

Plot

Cast
Paul Carr as Monk
Michael Pataki as Snake
Lee de Broux as Jesse
Jon Shank as Padre
Nancy Harris as Big Beth
T.J. Escott as Biff
Jessica Stuart as Stormy
Tom Anders as Marty
Joe Mosca as Villie
Michael Forest as Zeno
Jo Anne Meredith as Dawn Christian
Nanci Beck as Mary
Charles Macaulay as Curt
Hal England as Sidney
Ben Archibek as Jason
William 'Billy' Benedict as Station Attendant
Uschi Digard as Nude Gang Member with Blue Jeans at Orgy (uncredited)

References

External links

1970s action drama films
American action drama films
1972 films
American International Pictures films
Films directed by Jerry Jameson
1972 drama films
1970s English-language films
1970s American films